Northern Farm may refer to:
 Northern Farm (stud), a major Japanese horse breeding stud
 Northern Farm (book), a 1948 book by naturalist/writer Henry Beston